Josh Tickell (born August 7, 1975) is an American film director who specializes in movies with a social message. His first feature movie, Fuel  won the Sundance Audience Award for Best Documentary, was released theatrically in the United States and became a global sensation gaining over 1 million viewers on Netflix, iTunes, Hulu and CNBC. The movie was screened in the White House for energy and environment staff working in the Obama Administration.

Life and career
Tickell directed the Cannes Film Festival movie, The Big Fix. The film explores possible connections between corporate and political malfeasance and the 2010 Gulf of Mexico oil spill. He went on to direct his third film, Freedom (2011), which focuses on alcohol fuel and aired on the SuperChannel in Canada.  He completed his latest documentary, PUMP, and is currently in production on Good Fortune.

Tickell holds a Master's degree in Film from Florida State University's School of Motion Picture Arts.

Tickell is married to activist and former actress Rebecca Harrell Tickell.

The Veggie Van Voyage
Tickell returned to the US, bought an old diesel-powered Winnebago van that he painted with sunflowers and called the "Veggie Van". He built a small biodiesel processor that he named "The Green Grease Machine" and then set off on a 25,000 mile, two-year tour of the US powered by the biodiesel he made from used grease collected from fast food restaurants along the way. This journey, which eventually became known as The Veggie Van Voyage, attracted the attention of numerous media outlets, serving to promote the publicity of biodiesel as a viable alternative fuel.

Books
After the Veggie Van tour, Tickell co-wrote his first book, From the Fryer to the Fuel Tank – The Complete Guide to Using Vegetable Oil as an Alternative Fuel. 

His second book, Biodiesel America: How to Free America From Oil and Make Money with Alternative Fuel,  examines the status quo of the oil industry, the automakers and the government and offers an alternative energy roadmap to wean the US off fossil fuels.

Filmography 
 The Big Fix (with Rebecca Harrell Tickell)
 Pump
 Kiss the Ground (with Rebecca Harrell Tickell)
 On Common Ground (with Rebecca Harrell Tickell) (2023) about the 2016 Dakota Access Pipeline construction and associated protests on the Standing Rock Indian Reservation.

Clean energy advocacy
In September 2009, Tickell's documentary on alternative clean energy, Fuel, was rolled out into 150 cities.  In 2012, Tickell's advocacy for clean energy led him to join the advisory board of Grow Energy, a startup focused on developing algae as a viable energy resource.

Education

Tickell holds an undergraduate degree in Sustainable Living from New College of Florida. 

After the publication of his first book, Tickell enrolled in Florida State University's School of Motion Picture Television and Recording Arts where he earned his MFA in film.

See also 
 Algal fuel
 V2G

References 

Living people
American environmentalists
American documentary filmmakers
Writers from Louisiana
Biofuels
Open-source hardware people
1975 births